Tumtum is an unincorporated community in Stevens County, Washington, United States. Tumtum has a ZIP code of 99034.

Tumtum is a Chinook Jargon term meaning "heart/soul".

References

Unincorporated communities in Stevens County, Washington
Unincorporated communities in Washington (state)